Viola Davis is an American actress and producer who has appeared in film, television, and on stage. She received her equity card with her stage debut in 1988 with August Wilson's The Pittsburgh Cycle play Joe Turner's Come and Gone production of Trinity Repertory Company. After graduating from Juilliard School in 1993, Davis went on to perform several roles on stage in the 1990s, earning Theater World Award for her role in Seven Guitars (1996). In the same year, Davis guest-starred in the procedural drama series NYPD Blue, and made her film debut with a brief one-day role alongside Timothy Hutton in The Substance of Fire. In 1998, she appeared in Richard Benjamin's television movie The Pentagon Wars, and Steven Soderbergh's Out of Sight, before returning to the stage with an Obie Award winning titular performance in Off-Broadway Everybody's Ruby (1999).

Davis established herself as a leading actress of Broadway in the 2000s. She starred in her first recurring role in the 2000 medical drama City of Angels, before winning Tony Award for Best Featured Actress in a Play for her performance as a wife of ex-con in King Hedley II (2001), the ninth play of Wilson's The Pittsburgh Cycle. She received further acclaim for her role as a black seamstress in Intimate Apparel (2004) that won her the Drama Desk Award. Four years later, a supporting role in the period drama Doubt (2008) proved to be a breakthrough for Davis and she received Golden Globe for Best Supporting Actress and the Academy Award for Best Supporting Actress nominations for it. Davis starred opposite Denzel Washington as a dutiful yet strong minded wife Rose Maxson, in a revival of Wilson's play Fences (2010), that earned her Tony Award for Best Actress in a Play. The same year she played Julia Roberts' best friend in romantic-comedy Eat Pray Love.

In 2011, Davis's role in an ensemble drama as a housemaid in The Help earned her Best Actress Oscar nomination, among other accolades. Her performances in school drama Won't Back Down (2012), thriller Prisoners (2013), and biopic Get on Up (2014), added further acclaim to her career. Davis became the first black woman to win Emmy Award for Best Actress, for her role as criminal defense attorney Annalise Keating in television series How to Get Away with Murder (2014). In 2015, she starred and served as an executive producer in vigilante thriller Lila & Eve, and courtroom drama Custody the following year, both films received a mixed reception overall. She appeared as an antagonist Amanda Waller in superhero film Suicide Squad (2016), her biggest commercial success till date. In the same year, she and Washington reprised their role in the film-adaption of Fences, for which Davis received Best Supporting Actress honors at the BAFTAs, SAG Awards, Golden Globe Awards, and Academy Awards. Following her Oscar win, she became the first black actor to win Triple Crown of Acting. Davis co-founded the JuVee Productions with her husband Julius Tennon in 2012.

Filmography

Film

Television

Theatre

Producer

See also
 List of awards and nominations received by Viola Davis

References

Actress filmographies
American filmographies